Greece competed at the 1992 Summer Olympics in Barcelona, Spain.  Greek athletes have competed in every Summer Olympic Games. 70 competitors, 56 men and 14 women, took part in 53 events in 17 sports.

Medalists

Competitors
The following is the list of number of competitors in the Games.

Athletics

Men's 400m Hurdles
Athanassios Kalogiannis
 Heat — 49.52 (→ did not advance)

Men's Long Jump
Konstantinos Koukodimos
 Qualification — 8.22 m
 Final — 8.04 m (→ 6th place)

Spyridon Vasdekis
 Qualification — 7.82 m (→ did not advance)

Men's High Jump
 Kosmas Mikhalopoulos
 Qualification — 2.10  m (→ did not advance)

Men's Hammer Throw
Savvas Saritzoglou
 Qualification — 74.16 m (→ did not advance)

Men's Pole Vault
Christos Pallakis
 Qualification — 5.30 m (→ did not advance)

Women's High Jump
 Niki Gavera
 Qualification — 1.83  m (→ did not advance)

 Niki Bakogianni
 Qualification — 1.88 m (→ did not advance)

Boxing

Men's Heavyweight (– 91 kg) 
Georgios Stefanopoulos

Cycling

One male cyclist represented Greece in 1992.

Men's individual pursuit
 Georgios Portelanos

Men's points race
 Georgios Portelanos

Diving

Women's 3m Springboard
 Eleni Stavridou
 Preliminary Heat — 240.42 points (→ did not advance, 26th place)

Fencing

One male fencer represented Greece in 1992.

Men's sabre
 Zisis Babanasis

Judo

Modern pentathlon

One male pentathletes represented Greece in 1992.

Individual
 Alexandros Nikolopoulos

Rhythmic gymnastics

Rowing

Sailing

Men

Open

Shooting

Swimming

Men's 50m Freestyle
 Nikos Paleokrassas
 Heat – 23.51 (→ did not advance, 26th place)

 Nikos Steliou
 Heat – 23.51 (→ did not advance, 28th place)

Men's 100m Freestyle
 Nikos Paleokrassas
 Heat – 53.47 (→ did not advance, 53rd place)

Synchronized swimming

One synchronized swimmer represented Greece in 1992.

Women's solo
 Christina Thalassinidou

Tennis

Men's Doubles Competition
 Anastasios Bavelas and Konstantinos Efraimoglou
 First round — Defeated Christian Forcellini and Gabriel Francini (San Marino) 6-1, 6-1, 6-2
 Second round — Lost to Boris Becker and Michael Stich (Germany) 3-6, 1-6, 4-6

Water polo

Men's Team Competition
Preliminary Round (Group B)
 Lost to Cuba (9-10)
 Lost to Spain (6-11)
 Tied with the Netherlands (4-4)
 Lost to Hungary (7-12)
 Lost to Italy (6-8)
Classification Matches
 Defeated France (10-6)
 Defeated Czechoslovakia (10-8) → 10th place

Team Roster
 Kyriakos Giannopoulos
 Georgios Mavrotas
 Dimitrios Seletopoulos
 Anastasios Papanastasiou
 Evangelos Pateros
 Epaminondas Samartzidis
 Nikolaos Venetopoulos
 Filippos Kaiafas
 Evangelos Patras
 Gerasimos Voltirakis
 Theodoros Lorantos
 Konstantinos Loudis
 Dimitrios Bitsakos

Weightlifting

Wrestling

References

Nations at the 1992 Summer Olympics
1992
Olympics